The 2016 Albanian Supercup was the 23rd edition of the Albanian Supercup, an annual Albanian football match. The teams were decided by taking the winner of the previous season's Albanian Superliga and the winner of the Albanian Cup.

The match was contested by Skënderbeu Korçë, champions of the 2015–16 Albanian Superliga, and Kukësi, the 2015–16 Albanian Cup winners. Due to the demolition of the Qemal Stafa Stadium, the game was scheduled to be played at the newly reconstructed Loro Boriçi Stadium in Shkodër but the inauguration of the stadium was postponed until the friendly between Albania and Morocco on 31 August. The venue for the game was the Selman Stërmasi Stadium in Tiranë, the home of Tirana, and Kukësi won the game 3–1. The game was broadcast through DigitAlb's SuperSport Albania.

Details

See also

2015–16 Albanian Superliga
2015–16 Albanian Cup

References

2016
Albanian Supercup, 2016
Albanian Supercup, 2016
Supercup